Indigenous music of Australia comprises the music of the Aboriginal and Torres Strait Islander peoples of Australia, intersecting with their cultural and ceremonial observances, through the millennia of their individual and collective histories to the present day. The traditional forms include many aspects of performance and musical instrumentation that are unique to particular regions or Aboriginal Australian groups; and some elements of musical tradition are common or widespread through much of the Australian continent, and even beyond. The music of the Torres Strait Islanders is related to that of adjacent parts of New Guinea. Music is a vital part of Indigenous Australians' cultural maintenance.

In addition to these Indigenous traditions and musical heritage, ever since the 18th-century European colonisation of Australia began, Indigenous Australian musicians and performers have adopted and interpreted many of the imported Western musical styles, often informed by and in combination with traditional instruments and sensibilities. Similarly, non-Indigenous artists and performers have adapted, used and sampled Indigenous Australian styles and instruments in their works. Contemporary musical styles such as rock and roll, country, rap, hip hop and reggae have all featured a variety of notable Indigenous Australian performers.

Traditional instruments

Didgeridoo

A didgeridoo is a type of musical instrument that, according to western musicological classification, falls into the category of aerophone. It is one of the oldest instruments to date. It consists of a long tube, without finger holes, through which the player blows. It is sometimes fitted with a mouthpiece of beeswax. Didgeridoos are traditionally made of eucalyptus, but contemporary materials such as PVC piping are used. In traditional situations it is played only by men, usually as an accompaniment to ceremonial or recreational singing, or, much more rarely, as a solo instrument. Skilled players use the technique of circular breathing to achieve a continuous sound, and also employ techniques for inducing multiple harmonic resonances. Although traditionally the instrument was not widespread around the country - it was only used by Aboriginal groups in the most northerly areas - today it is commonly considered the national instrument of Aboriginal Australians and is world-renowned as a unique and iconic instrument. However, many Northern Aboriginal people continue to strenuously object to its frequent, inappropriate, use by both uninitiated Indigenous people of either gender, and by non-Indigenous Australians. Famous players include Djalu Gurruwiwi, Mark Atkins, William Barton, David Hudson, Joe Geia and Shane Underwood as well as white virtuoso Charlie McMahon.

Clapsticks 

A clapstick is a type of musical instrument that, according to western musicological classification, falls into the category of percussion. Unlike drumsticks, which are generally used to strike a drum, clapsticks are intended for striking one stick on another, and people as well. They are of oval shape with paintings of snakes, lizards, birds and more. Also called 'tatty' sticks.

Gum leaf 

The leaf of the Eucalyptus gum tree is used as a hand-held free reed instrument. The instrument was originally used to call birds. An example is the "Coo-ee" call seen in the opening credits of hit television series Skippy.

Bullroarer 

The bullroarer (or bull roarer) is an instrument used in ceremonial ritual. It consists of a few feet of cord attached to a flat piece of wood. The player holds the free end of the cord and swings the piece of wood around in circles, thus creating a humming sound. The intensity of the sound can be varied by changing the velocity of the rotation.

Rasp 
Percussive rasp similar to a Güiro or serrated club, along which the edge of a boomerang is drawn to produce a trill.

Traditional forms

Clan songs/manikay

Manikay are "clan songs" of some groups of Yolngu people of north-east Arnhem Land, including Yirrkala. These songs are often about clan or family history or other historical or mythological events of the area, social relationships and love, and are frequently updated to take into account popular films and music. Similar clan songs are known as emeba on Groote Eylandt. Manikay have been described as the "sacred song tradition performed by the Yolŋu when conducting public ceremonies...a medium through which the Yolŋu interpret reality, define their humanity, reckon their ancestral lineages, and evidence ownership of their hereditary homelands through their ability to sing in the tradition of their ancestors". It is often translated as a "clan song", and ethnomusicologists and social anthropologists have studied the form since the 1950s.

Manikay is often used to describe the song component of the Arnhem Land ceremony, while bunggul (see below) refers to the dance, although each word on its own is also sometimes used to refer to both components.

Songlines

Songlines, also known as "dreaming tracks", represent paths across the land or sky marking the routes followed by creator beings during The Dreaming. The paths of the songlines are recorded in traditional song cycles, stories, dance, and art, and are often the basis of ceremonies. Intricate series of song cycles identify landmarks and tracking mechanisms for navigation.

Transcription

Early visitors and settlers published a number of transcriptions of traditional Aboriginal music. The earliest transcription of Aboriginal music was by Edward Jones in London in 1793, published in Musical Curiosities, 1811. Two Eora men (of the Sydney area in New South Wales), Yemmerrawanne and Bennelong, had travelled to England with Arthur Phillip, and while they were in London gave a recital of a song in the Dharug language.

Northern Australia

Bunggul
The Yolngu term Bunggul refers to song, music and dance, which form a ceremony in central to eastern Arnhem Land, Northern Territory. It is performed east of the Mann River as far south as Mainoru and southeast across the Rose River region to Numbulwar. The songs contain specific words and use a similar structure, and there is often a "final recitative", where lyrics are sung for a long period after the didjeridu and stick beating has stopped. Some songs tell of epic journeys in the far past, of ancestors in the Dreaming; Elkin cited an example of a song series from consisting of 188 songs. Those of the Djatpangarri style, tell of everyday events. The lyrics differ much from song to song, and can vary from performance to performance, improvised by the musicians and lead "songman", within certain structures and patterns. The leader of the ritual choreographs not only the dancers, but also the music, in this form, in contrast to western Arnhem Land, where the songman leads.

Bunggul is often used to describe the dance component of the ceremony, while manikay refers to the songs.

The Garma Festival has a nightly bunggul performance. In 2014, The Monthlys "Best of Australian Arts" edition described the bunggul as "an exhilarating performance" and "an example of one of the world’s oldest musical traditions. We must do everything to recognise its enormous value to our lives as Australians".

Kun-borrk
Kun-borrk (also spelt kunborrk and gunborg) originated east of the Adelaide, southeast towards Katherine and across to just east of the Mann River and southeast almost to Rose River, then along the coastline beyond Borroloola.

Kun-borrk songs always include actual words, in contrast to other song styles of the region which may consist of sounds, and there are often brief breaks in the songs. The songs nearly always start with the didjeridu, soon followed by sticks (percussion) and vocals in that order. Kun-borrk songs from Kunbarllanjnja (Gunbalanya) almost always follow the order of didjeridu, voice then sticks. Kun-borrk songs terminate most commonly with the didjeridu first, often in conjunction with vocals. Sometimes the vocals finish first, sometimes the clap sticks, but the didjeridu never starts last or finishes last.

David Blanasi is known as a master of the tradition of Kun-borrk, with his grandson Darryl Dikarrna continuing the tradition.

Wajarra
Wajarra are non-sacred songs originating in the Gurindji region of the Northern Territory and performed for fun and entertainment. During the twentieth century they spread great distances across northern and western Australia, including along the stock routes of the pastoral industry, as Aboriginal workers and their families travelled between stations. Wave Hill Station was the site of much of this exchange.

Wangga

Wangga originated near the South Alligator River. An extremely high note starts the song, accompanied by rhythmic percussion, followed by a sudden shift to a low tone. Wangga is typically performed by one or two singers with clapsticks and one didgeridoo player. The occasion is usually a circumcision ceremony or a ceremony to purify a dead person's belongings with smoke.

Contemporary trends

A number of Indigenous Australians have achieved mainstream prominence, such as Jimmy Little (pop), Yothu Yindi (Australian aboriginal rock), Troy Cassar-Daley (country), Jessica Mauboy (pop, R&B), NoKTuRNL (rap metal) and the Warumpi Band (alternative or world music). Indigenous music has also gained broad exposure through the world music movement and in particular the WOMADelaide festivals.  Geoffrey Gurrumul Yunupingu, formerly of Yothu Yindi, attained international success singing contemporary music in English and in one of the languages of the Yolngu people.

Successful Torres Strait Islander musicians include Christine Anu (pop) and Seaman Dan.

Contemporary Indigenous music continues the earlier traditions and also represents a fusion with contemporary mainstream styles of music, such as rock and country music. The Deadlys provide an illustration of this with rock, country, pop among the styles played. Traditional instruments such as the didjeridu and clapsticks are commonly used, giving the music a distinctive feel.

Country music has remained particularly popular among the Australian Aboriginal and Torres Strait Islander peoples for decades, as documented in Clinton Walker's seminal Buried Country. Dougie Young and Jimmy Little were pioneers and Troy Cassar-Daley is among Australia's successful contemporary Indigenous performers of country music. Aboriginal artists Kev Carmody and Archie Roach employ a combination of folk-rock and country music to sing about Aboriginal rights issues, using the song type called barnt. The documentary, book and soundtrack Buried Country showcases significant Indigenous musicians from the 1940s to the 1990s.

The movie Wrong Side of the Road and its soundtrack (1981), highlighting Indigenous disadvantage in urban Australia, gave broad exposure to the bands Us Mob and No Fixed Address.

Australian hip hop music and rap music has a number of Aboriginal exponents, including the award-winning Baker Boy, 2019 Young Australian of the Year, who raps and sings in Yolngu Matha.

The genre-defying Mojo Juju has been nominated for or won several awards since 2018, and her music has been featured in a number of television shows including Underbelly: Razor, Underbelly: Squizzy and Roadtrip Nation.

Thelma Plum released her debut album, Better in Blak, in July 2019.

DOBBY is an Aboriginal/Filipino musician, mostly rapper and drummer, who has played with the Sydney band Jackie Brown Jr. As a member of the Murrawarri Republic, he sings in Murrawarri language as well as English, and is a political activist for Aboriginal issues.

The nephew of Dr M. Yunupiŋu and the son of Stuart Kellaway, both founding members of Yothu Yindi, started their own band, King Stingray, whose sound they call "Yolngu surf rock". Their first single, written by Yirrnga Yunupiŋu and Roy Kellaway, was released in October 2020.

Training institutions
In 1997 the State and Federal Governments set up the Aboriginal Centre for the Performing Arts (ACPA) as an elite National Institute to preserve and nurture Aboriginal and Torres Strait Islander music and talent across all styles and genres, from traditional to contemporary.

See also

3KND community radio station, streaming on the internet and broadcasting in Melbourne and in Brisbane.
Aboriginal rock music
 Buried Country, film and book about Indigenous country music
Central Australian Aboriginal Media Association (CAAMA), organisation promoting Aboriginal music
National Indigenous Music Awards
Deadly Awards
First Nations Media Australia, national peak body for Indigenous broadcasting, media and communications 
Indigenous Australian hip hop
Stompen Ground, Broome
Vibe Australia

References

Further reading
Dunbar-Hall, P. & Gibson, C., (2004), Deadly Sounds, Deadly Places: Contemporary Aboriginal Music in Australia, UNSW Press, 
Marett, Allan, Barwick, Linda and Ford, Lysbeth (2013), For the Sake of a Song: Wangga Songmen and Their Repertories, Sydney University Press, 
Stubington, Jill (2007), Singing the Land - the power of performance in Aboriginal life, Foreword by Raymattja Marika, Currency House Inc.,  (hbk.) :  9780980280234 (pbk.)
Turpin, Myfanwy and Meakin, Felicity (2019), Songs from the Stations, Sydney University Press, 
 Walker, Clinton (2000/2015), Buried Country: The Story of Aboriginal Country Music, Verse Chorus Press, 
 Warren, A. & Evitt, R. (2010), Indigenous Hip hop: overcoming marginality, encountering constraints, Australian Geographer 41(1), pp. 141–158.
Dean, L with Roger Knox (2020), 'Roger Knox & The Pine Valley Cosmonauts, Stranger in My Land' (2013); Roger Knox, Give it a Go (1983). In Jon Stratton and Jon Dale with Tony Mitchell,  An Anthology of Australian Albums: Critical Engagements, Bloomsbury Academic,  (hbk.)

External links
DOBBY - rapper, drummer, composer. Indigenous Studies Honours (focusing on Aboriginal Hip Hop music) 2015.
Indigenous Contemporary Music Action Plan 2008
Protocols for producing Indigenous Australian music 2nd edition. (Australia Council, 2007) 
Manikay.Com - For the promotion and enjoyment of traditional Arnhem Land music.
Blacklist.org.au - Dedicated to promoting and sharing the music and culture of Indigenous Australia.
Traditional music of the Torres Strait - audio and video highlights from the archives of the celebrated Australian Institute of Aboriginal and Torres Strait Islander Studies (AIATSIS) . Released by Skinnyfish music - recorded in 1960 and 1961, with the support of the Department of Anthropology, Australian National University. (Commercial link).
CAAMA Music Myspace - For the promotion and enjoyment of Indigenous Music under the CAAMA Music Label. (Commercial link).
Wilurarra Creative, Music Development Western Desert Australia
Australian Music Office - Australian Government organisation aimed at promoting export initiatives for Australian artists and music companies
 Listen to an excerpt of Indigenous tribal music from the Yirrkala district in far north-east Arnhem Land, recorded by AP Elkin on australianscreen online
For the Sake of a Song - audio recordings of wangga performances from the Daly region of northwestern Australia, with information about wangga.
Songs from the Stations - audio and video recordings of wajarra performances by Gurindji singers from the Northern Territory.

 
Torres Strait Islands culture
Australian styles of music